The 1966 Illinois Fighting Illini football team was an American football team that represented the University of Illinois during the 1966 Big Ten Conference football season. In their seventh year under head coach Pete Elliott, the Illini compiled a 4–6 record and finished in a tie for third place in the Big Ten Conference.

The team's offensive leaders were quarterback Bob Naponic with 998 passing yards, running back Bill Huston with 420 rushing yards, and John Wright with 831 receiving yards. Guard Ron Guenther was selected as the team's most valuable player.

Schedule

References

Illinois
Illinois Fighting Illini football seasons
Illinois Fighting Illini football